Nucleolar and spindle associated protein 1 is a protein that in humans is encoded by the NUSAP1 gene.

Function

NUSAP1 is a nucleolar-spindle-associated protein that plays a role in spindle microtubule organization (Raemaekers et al., 2003 [PubMed 12963707]).[supplied by OMIM, Jun 2009].

References

Further reading